Pinghu is a county-level city in the east of Jiaxing's administrative area, in the northeast of Zhejiang Province, bordering Shanghai to the northeast. It sits next to the East China Sea and the north shore of Hangzhou Bay. Prior to the Ming Dynasty, Pinghu was part of Haiyan County.  In 1430 Pinghu County was established.  In 1991 Pinghu became a county-level city under the administration of the prefecture-level city of Jiaxing.

History

Zhapu, the site of a deepwater harbor, was the principal site of China's foreign trade with Korea and Japan during the 18th and 19th century.

Administration
3 neighborhoods (subdistricts), 7 towns
neighborhood committee and offices
Zhongdai neighborhood
Danghu neighborhood
Caoqiao neighborhood
towns
Zhapu 
Xindai
Xincang
Huanggu 
Quantang
Guangchen 
Lindai

Geography and climate
Pinghu is located on a low and flat plain and is laced with a network of rivers. A number of islands, such as Wangpan Shan are located offshore. Agricultural production is marked by its amount of aquatic products. Important crops are rice, wheat, Chinese cabbage, prawns, and bird eggs. Specialties include pickled eggs and watermelons. Due to its proximity to Shanghai, Pinghu also attracts investment from many multinational enterprises. Industry includes clothing, packaging, machinery, paper and others. Clothing production is especially high, with the value of Pinghu's total clothing exports the greatest in China. It has been placed as one of China's one hundred most productive areas.

Zhapu harbor in the municipality's southwest is an important deep water harbor along Hangzhou Bay.  A port has been located here since the Tang dynasty, and it is still an important transshipment point. Next to the harbor is one of China's most important large thermal power plants, Jiaxing Powerplant, with a capacity of 3,000,000 kilowatts.

In modern China many famous monks, educators and artists (music, calligraphy, painting, seals, poetry) have come from Pinghu.  The city's downtown contains a large memorial to Li Shutong and a number of other attractions and scenic spots.

References 

County-level cities in Zhejiang
Port cities and towns in China
Jiaxing